South Africa competed at the 2004 Summer Olympics in Athens, Greece, from 13 to 29 August 2004.  This was the nation's sixteenth overall and fourth consecutive appearance at the Summer Olympics in the post-apartheid era. The South African Sports Confederation and Olympic Committee (SASCOC) sent a total of 106 athletes to the Games, 66 men and 40 women, to compete in 19 sports. Field hockey was the only team-based sport in which South Africa had its representation at these Games. There was only a single competitor in archery, canoeing, diving, artistic and rhythmic gymnastics, judo, sailing, shooting, taekwondo, and wrestling.

The South African team featured four Olympic medalists from Sydney: breaststroke swimmer Terence Parkin, high jumper Hestrie Cloete, discus thrower Frantz Kruger, and hurdler Llewellyn Herbert. Several athletes made their third consecutive Olympic appearance, including freestyle Ryk Neethling and middle distance runner Hezekiél Sepeng, who previously won the silver in Atlanta for the men's 800 metres. Sepeng's fellow runner and teammate Mbulaeni Mulaudzi, a top medal contender on the same event, later became the nation's flag bearer in the opening ceremony.

South Africa left Athens with a remarkable tally of six Olympic medals, one gold, three silver, and two bronze, being considered its most successful Olympics since the 1996 Summer Olympics in Atlanta. The highlight of the South African team at these Games came with a surprising triumph in men's swimming, when Roland Mark Schoeman, Ryk Neethling, Lyndon Ferns, and Darian Townsend held a major upset on the Aussies, Americans, and the Dutch for a new world record and a prestigious gold medal in the 4 × 100 m freestyle relay. Furthermore, Schoeman completed a full set of medals to become the most decorated South African athlete at these Games, adding his silver in the men's 100 m freestyle and bronze in the men's 50 m freestyle. Cloete managed to repeat her silver from Sydney in the women's high jump, while Donovan Cech and Ramon di Clemente claimed a bronze for the first time in men's rowing.

Field hockey players Craig and Natalie Fulton became the first married couple to represent South Africa at the same Olympic Games.

Medalists

Archery

One South African archer qualified for the women's individual archery through the African Championships.

Athletics

South African athletes have so far achieved qualifying standards in the following athletics events (up to a maximum of 3 athletes in each event at the 'A' Standard, and 1 at the 'B' Standard).

Men
Track & road events

Field events

Women
Track & road events

Field events

Combined events – Heptathlon

Badminton

Boxing

South Africa sent three boxers to Athens.

Canoeing

Sprint

Qualification Legend: Q = Qualify to final; q = Qualify to semifinal

Cycling

Road

Diving

South African divers qualified for two individual spots at the 2004 Olympic Games.

Women

Fencing

Women

Field hockey

Men's tournament

Roster

Group play

Classification match (9th–12th place)

9th place final

Women's tournament

Roster

Group play

9th place final

Gymnastics

Artistic
Women

Rhythmic

Judo

South Africa has qualified a single judoka.

Rowing

South African rowers qualified the following boats:

Men

Qualification Legend: FA=Final A (medal); FB=Final B (non-medal); FC=Final C (non-medal); FD=Final D (non-medal); FE=Final E (non-medal); FF=Final F (non-medal); SA/B=Semifinals A/B; SC/D=Semifinals C/D; SE/F=Semifinals E/F; R=Repechage

Sailing

South African sailors have qualified one boat for each of the following events.

Open

M = Medal race; OCS = On course side of the starting line; DSQ = Disqualified; DNF = Did not finish; DNS= Did not start; RDG = Redress given

Shooting

Men

Swimming

South African swimmers earned qualifying standards in the following events (up to a maximum of 2 swimmers in each event at the A-standard time, and 1 at the B-standard time):

Men

Taekwondo

Triathlon

Two South African triathletes qualified for the following events.

Volleyball

Beach

Wrestling

Men's freestyle

See also
 South Africa at the 2004 Summer Paralympics

References

External links
Official Report of the XXVIII Olympiad
South African Sports Confederation and Olympic Committee (SASCOC)

Nations at the 2004 Summer Olympics
2004
Summer Olympics